The men's triple jump at the 2022 World Athletics Indoor Championships took place on 18 March 2022.

Results
The final was started at 12:15.

References

Triple jump
Triple jump at the World Athletics Indoor Championships